Agith Rajapaksha (born 17 June 1995) is a Sri Lankan cricketer. He made his first-class debut for Sri Lanka Army Sports Club in the 2018–19 Premier League Tournament on 28 December 2018.

References

External links
 

1995 births
Living people
Sri Lankan cricketers
Sri Lanka Army Sports Club cricketers
Place of birth missing (living people)